The Macha Oromo Confederation, also known as the Western Oromo Confederation or simply as Macha Oromo, was an Oromo separatist movement in Abyssinia during the Second Italo-Ethiopian War.  The Abyssinians used to call them by the derogatory name "Galla" which is offensive to Oromo communities and one of the causes attributed to the Oromo struggle against the Ethiopian Empire. The movement sought to split off from Abyssinia and become a mandate of the United Kingdom, however Western Oromia (Macha Oromo) gained no international recognition.

Captain Esme Nourse Erskine was the British Consul at Gore from 1928 to 1936. During the Italian invasion 1935-1936, Erskine helped the Western Oromo Confederation chiefs with their application, which he probably drafted, to the League of Nations, in which  Oromo chiefs asked “to be placed under a British mandate … until we achieve self government”. He forwarded the applications to the British Foreign Office. The British government declined to forward these applications to the League of Nations.

References

Sources
 Smidt, Wolbert. "Western Galla Confederation". Encyclopaedia Aethiopica.
 Gebissa, E. (2002). The Italian Invasion, the Ethiopian Empire, and Oromo Nationalism: The Significance of the Western Oromo Confederation of 1936. Northeast African Studies, 9(3), new series, 75-96. Retrieved December 16, 2020, from http://www.jstor.org/stable/41931281
 Zewde, B. (1987). An Overview and Assessment of Gambella Trade (1904-1935). The International Journal of African Historical Studies, 20(1), 75-94. doi:10.2307/219279

Ethiopian Empire
History of Ethiopia
Former countries in Africa